The 2007 Villanova Wildcats football team was an American football team that represented the Villanova University as a member of the Atlantic 10 Conference during the 2007 NCAA Division I FCS football season. In their 23rd year under head coach Andy Talley, the team compiled a 7–4 record.

Schedule

References

Villanova
Villanova Wildcats football seasons
Villanova Wildcats football